The Ordnance QF 12-pounder 8 cwt was a Royal Navy "landing gun" intended for navy use ashore. "8 cwt" refers to the weight of the gun and breech, approximately 8 cwt = 8 x  = . This was how the British often differentiated between guns of the same calibre or weight of shell.

History 
Fourteen were converted into anti-aircraft guns as Mk I*.

The Royal Navy eventually replaced the gun with the  mountain howitzer.

Combat use

Second Boer War 
The gun was used in the early stages of the Second Boer War in Natal.

World War I 

These guns were employed on land in the West Africa campaign. They were also employed in the East Africa campaign ("Logan's Battery" 6th Field Battery, 2 guns, towed first by Hupmobile cars and then REO lorries).

This gun was briefly used in the Battle of Gallipoli, as the Royal Navy had supplies of ammunition for it when the army was short of ammunition for its own guns. Several guns were landed in July 1915 and operated from frontline trenches.

Surviving examples 

There is a surviving example held and maintained at Devonport Field Gun Association Heritage Centre & Museum at Crownhill Fort, Plymouth. There are also three examples at the Royal Canadian Sea Cadets summer training camp at HMCS Acadia in Cornwallis, Nova Scotia. They still fired regularly, although they only fire blanks for ceremonial and training purposes. One example is located at HMCS Star in Hamilton, Ontario and is in use by the Hamilton Sea Cadet Corps.

See also 
This cannon is the type used in the famous British Royal Navy Field Gun Runs.

In popular culture 

Notes and references

Bibliography 
 Text Book of Gunnery, 1902. LONDON : PRINTED FOR HIS MAJESTY'S STATIONERY OFFICE, BY HARRISON AND SONS, ST. MARTIN'S LANE 
 Dale Clarke, British Artillery 1914–1919. Field Army Artillery. Osprey Publishing, Oxford UK, 2004 
 General Sir Martin Farndale, History of the Royal Regiment of Artillery : Forgotten Fronts and the Home Base 1914–18. Royal Artillery Institution, London, 1988. 
 
 Major Darrell Hall, "Guns in South Africa 1899–1902 Part III and IV" The South African Military History Society Military History Journal – Vol 2 No 2, December 1971
 Major Darrell Hall, "THE NAVAL GUNS IN NATAL 1899-1902" The South African Military History Society Military History Journal – Vol 4 No 3, June 1978

External links 

 YouTube ''Running with 3/4 Soddin Ton! RN team practice with QF 12 pdr for Navy Gun Run
 For access to view the surviving example

Artillery of the United Kingdom
World War I artillery of the United Kingdom
76 mm artillery
Naval guns of the United Kingdom
World War I naval weapons of the United Kingdom